Poutasi may refer to:

People 

Jeremiah Poutasi (born 1994) American football player
Karen Poutasi (born 1949), New Zealand government official
Poutasi Luafutu (born 1987) Australian rugby union player

Places 

Poutasi, village in Samoa